The 1959 Baltimore Orioles season was the franchise's sixth season in Baltimore, Maryland, and its 59th overall. It resulted with the Orioles finishing sixth in the American League with a record of 74 wins and 80 losses, 22 games behind the AL champion Chicago White Sox.

Offseason 
 October 2, 1958: Dick Williams was traded by the Orioles to the Kansas City Athletics for Chico Carrasquel.
 Prior to 1959 season (exact date unknown)
John Anderson was obtained by the Orioles from the Miami Marlins after expiration of minor league working agreement.
Bob Saverine was signed as an amateur free agent by the Orioles.

Regular season 
 June 10, 1959: Rocky Colavito of the Cleveland Indians hit four home runs in one game against the Orioles.

Season standings

Record vs. opponents

Opening Day starters 
Bob Boyd
Billy Gardner
Ron Hansen
Al Pilarcik
Arnie Portocarrero
Brooks Robinson
Willie Tasby
Gus Triandos
Gene Woodling

Notable transactions 
 April 1, 1959: Vito Valentinetti was acquired by the Orioles from the Washington Senators in exchange for Billy Loes. The trade was voided and the players returned to their original teams on April 8.
 May 21, 1959: Bobby Ávila was acquired by the Boston Red Sox from the Orioles off waivers.
 May 26, 1959: Albie Pearson was acquired by the Orioles from the Washington Senators in exchange for Lenny Green.
 June 15, 1959: Billy Hoeft was acquired by the Orioles from the Boston Red Sox in exchange for Jack Harshman.
 June 23, 1959: Whitey Lockman was traded by the Orioles to the Cincinnati Redlegs for Walt Dropo.
 September 6, 1959: Rip Coleman was acquired by the Orioles off waivers from the Kansas City Athletics.

Roster

Player stats

Batting

Starters by position 
Note: Pos = Position; G = Games played; AB = At bats; H = Hits; Avg. = Batting average; HR = Home runs; RBI = Runs batted in

Other batters 
Note: G = Games played; AB = At bats; H = Hits; Avg. = Batting average; HR = Home runs; RBI = Runs batted in

Pitching

Starting pitchers 
Note: G = Games pitched; IP = Innings pitched; W = Wins; L = Losses; ERA = Earned run average; SO = Strikeouts

Other pitchers 
Note: G = Games pitched; IP = Innings pitched; W = Wins; L = Losses; ERA = Earned run average; SO = Strikeouts

Relief pitchers 
Note: G = Games pitched; W = Wins; L = Losses; SV = Saves; ERA = Earned run average; SO = Strikeouts

Farm system

Notes

References 

1959 Baltimore Orioles team page at Baseball Reference
1959 Baltimore Orioles season at baseball-almanac.com

Baltimore Orioles seasons
Baltimore Orioles season
Baltimore Orio